Nebraska Highway 109 is a highway in eastern Nebraska.  Its southern terminus is at U.S. Highway 77 and Nebraska Highway 92 at Wahoo, Nebraska.  Its northern terminus is at U.S. Highway 77 near Fremont, Nebraska.

Route description
The route goes north from its intersection with US 77 and NE 92 and heads into farmland, passing through Colon.  At Cedar Bluffs, NE 109 meets Nebraska Spur 78H and turns east.  It continues east until ending at US 77 south of Fremont.

Major intersections

References

External links

Nebraska Roads: NE 101-119

109
Transportation in Saunders County, Nebraska